Lester Robert Barnard (December 17, 1920 – April 15, 1951), known as Junior Barnard, was an American Western swing guitarist who was a member of Bob Wills and his Texas Playboys. He was among the first electric guitarists to create a guitar effect that anticipated fuzz tone, which is usually associated with later guitarists.

Early life

Barnard was born into a musical family in Coweta, Oklahoma in 1920. Both his father, Hurl Lester Barnard and his uncle Robert played the fiddle and performed at barn dances and house parties. By the time he had reached 13 or 14 Junior had begun accompanying his father on guitar. His brother Gene was also an accomplished guitarist.  At 15 Barnard began playing acoustic guitar with bands in the Tulsa area and he also had his own show on the KTUL radio station. He also worked as a staff musician backing groups such as Patti Page and Her Musical Pages.

Bob Wills

After a period of playing with fiddler Art Davis and the Rhythm Riders, Barnard was hired by Bob Wills to play with the Lonestar Rangers which was fronted by John Wills, Bob's father. This began an on-off relationship with the Wills family that was to last the rest of Barnard's life. In 1936 Bob Wills formed the Sons of the West which was led by his cousin Son Lansford and Barnard was drafted in as guitarist. Around a year later, by which time this band was based in Amarillo, Texas, Barnard had left and returned to Tulsa to work for radio station KTUL. In 1937 he bought his first electric guitar and later that year replaced Eldon Shamblin in Dave Edwards’ Original Alabama Boys, Shamblin having left to join the Texas Playboys. In 1938 Barnard was again part of the Wills organization this time playing guitar for The Rhythmaires led by Bob's brother Johnnie Lee. This lasted for six months before Barnard started playing with Wills’ father again in a band called Uncle John and his Young Five.

World War 2

By the time of America's entry into the war at the end of 1941, Barnard had recorded several sides with Johnnie Lee Wills for Decca and as 1942 progressed, he was called upon by Bob Wills to join the Playboys as many of Wills’ band were being called up for military service. By the fall of that year Wills himself had enlisted in the Army. Barnard received a deferment because of his excessive weight and went to work as a welder at a defense plant in California.

Guitar style and equipment

Barnard was one of the first guitarists to play in a style that deliberately incorporated a distorted guitar tone which he achieved by pushing low powered valve or tube amps to their limits. He developed a lot of techniques that are common amongst guitarists today such as fast runs, extreme string bends, hammer-ons and pull-offs. Barnard was also noted for his steady rhythm playing and chord use. 

Barnard's main guitar during his time as a Playboy was a blond Epiphone Emperor arch top model which he inherited from Jimmy Wyble after he replaced Wyble in 1945. Barnard also used a Gibson ES-150 from time to time but it was the Epiphone that was to become his main instrument as he developed his style and modified his equipment to match it. The guitar was first electrified by Junior when he added a DeArmond pickup to neck position. At some point in 1947 a bridge position pickup was added by Leo Fender. This seems to be a lapsteel pickup as the strings actually pass through the pickup structure rather than over it. For this set up Junior began running two amplifiers, one for each pickup: an Epiphone and a Fender Pro model with 15 inch speaker. Eldon Shamblin recalled that Junior used a volume pedal when it was his time to take a solo. Because it was never clear when Wills would like players to solo, the pedal became a time saving device.

Death

On April 15, 1951, while scouting for places to play in Riverdale, California (south Fresno County), Barnard and his brother-in-law, Billie Earl Fitzgerald were killed in an automobile accident when their car collided with six members of the Cal Poly (San Luis Obispo) track team. Fitzgerald died instantly and Barnard died five hours later at Fresno County Hospital. He was 30 years old and left behind his wife and two sons.

Discography
 The Tiffany Transcriptions, Bob Wills (Collectors Choice)
Junior Barnard appeared on the following tracks in the Tiffany Transcriptions series: 

The Tiffany Transcriptions Vol. 1 

Nancy Jane Dinah
Cotton Patch Blues
Sweet Jennie Lee
I Hear You Talkin'
The Girl I Left Behind Me
Straighten Up And Fly Right
Little Betty Brown
Nobody's Sweetheart Now
Blackout Blues
What's The Matter With The Mill 

The Tiffany Transcriptions Vol. 2 

Take Me Back To Tulsa
Faded Love
Right Or Wrong
Bring It On Down To My House
Cherokee Maiden
Steel Guitar Rag
Stay A Little Longer
Roly Poly
Time Changes Everything
Ida Red
Maiden's Prayer
San Antonio Rose 

The Tiffany Transcriptions Vol. 3 

Basin Street Blues
I'm A Ding Dong Daddy
Milk Cow Blues
Please Don't Talk About Me When I'm Gone
It's Your Red Wagon
Good Man Is Hard To Find
Barnard Blues
I Never Knew
Baby Won't You Please Come Home 

The Tiffany Transcriptions Vol. 4 

Texas Playboy Theme 
You're From Texas
Lum & Abner Special (San Antonio Rose)
Texarkana Baby
Little Joe The Wrangler
Texas Plains
Home In San Antone
Blue Bonnet Lane
Along The Navajo Trail
Spanish Fandango
My Brown Eyed Texas Rose
Red River Valley
Texas Playboy Theme (Closing) 

The Tiffany Transcriptions Vol. 5 

My Window Faces The South
I Had Someone Else Before I Had You
Don't Cry Baby
Three Guitar Special
China Town
Fat Boy Rag
Sweet Kind Of Love
A Little bit of Boogie 

Tiffany Transcriptions Vol. 6 

Oklahoma Hills
Sally Goodin (Instrumental)
I Had A Little Mule
Playboy Chimes
Never No More Hard Times Blues
I'll Get Mine Bye And Bye
I'm Putting All My Eggs In One Basket
Oklahoma Rag
Sally Goodin 

Tiffany Transcriptions Vol. 7 

Keep Knockin' (But You Can't Come In)
Worried mind
My Gal Sal
Too Long 

Tiffany Transcriptions Vol. 8

Miss Molly
Ten Years
Blues For Dixie
Twinkle Twinkle Little Star
Sun Bonnet Sue
Sitting On Top Of The World
There's Gonna Be A Party For The Old Folks
South
Trouble In Mind
Little Liza Jane
Sioux City Sue
My Confession
Get Along Home Cindy

Tiffany Transcriptions Vol. 9 

Texas Playboy Rag
My Life's Been A Pleasure
G. I. Wish
Shame on you
You Don't Care What Happens
St. Louis Blues (Part One)
St. Louis Blues (Part Two)
Sentimental Journey
Back Home In Indiana 

Tiffany Transcriptions Vol 10. 

Betcha My Heart
I'm Crying My Heart Out
It's All Over Now
Jealous Hearted Me
Don't Sweetheart Me
Miss You
I Want My Mama
I Dreamed Of An Old Love Affair
Echoes From The Hills
Hawaiian War Chant
When Day Is Done
Put Your Arms Around Me
Will There Be Any Yodeling In Heaven
Tumbling Tumbleweeds
To You Sweetheart Aloha
There's A Silver Moon On The Golden Gate
Pal Of My Lonely Hour

References

1920 births
1951 deaths
American country guitarists
American male guitarists
Western swing performers
Guitarists from Oklahoma
People from Coweta, Oklahoma
20th-century American guitarists
Country musicians from Oklahoma
20th-century American male musicians
Road incident deaths in California